Eurema ada, the Talbot's Grass Yellow, is a species of butterfly in the genus Eurema. It was discovered in northern Borneo and described in 1871. Its main distinctive features are that its ground color is pale sulfurous, not white, and the border margins on its wings are blacker and wider. Wingspan is 35 mm.

Known subspecies
Listed alphabetically:
E. a. choui Gu, 1994
E. a. indosinica Yata, 1991
E. a. iona Talbot, 1939
E. a. prabha Fruhstorfer
E. a. toba (de Nicéville), [1896])
E. a. varga Fruhstorfer
E. a. yaksha Fruhstorfer

References

ada
Butterflies described in 1887
Butterflies of Borneo
Butterflies of Indochina